Again Kasargod Khader Bhai is a 2010 Indian Malayalam-language film directed by Thulasidas, starring Jagadish, Ashokan, Baiju, Innocent, Radha Varma and Gautham Krishn. The film is a sequel to the films Mimics Parade (1991) and Kasargod Khader Bhai (1992).

Plot
The artists of Kaladarshana, led by Unni reunites to celebrate the sixtieth birthday of founder Fr. Tharakkandam. There they get an invitation to perform a Mimics programme at Viyyoor central jail. Kasargod Khader Bhai's son Kasim Bhai is currently in the same jail and he has vengeance on Kaladarshana troop who were behind his arrest. He attacks them during the programme. The next day Kasim Bhai is found murdered. The suspicion falls on the Kaladarshana team. The unfolding of the murder mystery forms the rest of the story.

Cast
 Jagadish as Unni
 Ashokan as Jimmy
 Baiju as Manoj
 Innocent as Fr. Francis Tharakkandam
 Salim Kumar as Kaalam
 Bijukuttan as Kochanty
 Dharmajan as Raju
 Radha Varma as Raziya / Anna Kareena 
 Gautham Krishn as C.I. Basheer Mohammad
 Suraj Venjaramood as S.I. Mithun Chakravarthy (M.C)
 Babu Antony as Kasargod Kasim Bhai
 Siddique as Sabu (Voice Only)
 Narayanankutty
 Thesni Khan as Shittymol/ Dance teacher
 Manju Satheesh as Nancy, Jimmy's wife
 Suresh Krishna as Ameer Ajmal
 Adithya Menon as Ali Khan
 Sadiq as Jail Superintendent Joseph Palathingal / Stephen Cherian
 Shammi Thilakan as S.I Siju Jose
 Alummoodan as Kasargod Khader Bhai (Photo Archieve)
 Kalabhavan Haneef as mimicry artist / Beggar

References

External links
 
 Nowrunning article
 Cinecurry article
 Mastimovies article

2010s Malayalam-language films
2010 comedy films
2010 films
Indian sequel films
FMimicKader3
Indian comedy films
Indian prison films
Fictional portrayals of the Kerala Police
Films shot in Thrissur
Films directed by Thulasidas